Moretti is an Italian surname. Notable people with the surname include:

Alessandra Moretti (born 1973), Italian politician
Amalia Moretti (1872–1947), Italian physician and journalist
Amy Schwartz Moretti, American violinist
Andrea Moretti (born 1972), former Italian rugby union player 
Bob Moretti (1936–1984), Californian politician
Bruno Moretti (born 1957), Italian composer and frequent collaborator with choreographer Mauro Bigonzetti
Bruno Moretti (Paralympian) (1941–2021), Australian Paralympian
Cristina Favre-Moretti (born 1963), Swiss ski mountaineer, long-distance runner and mountain biker
Christopher Moretti (born 1986), Italian Grand Prix motorcycle racer
Cristoforo Moretti, Lombard painter of the quattrocento
David Moretti (born 1981), American actor
Davide Moretti (born 1998), Italian basketball player; son of Paolo Moretti
Elena Moretti (born 1987), Italian judoka
Emiliano Moretti (born 1981), Italian footballer
Enrico Moretti, Italian-born American economist
Éric Dupond-Moretti (born 1961), French criminal defence lawyer
Fabrizio Moretti (art dealer) (born 1976), Italian art dealer
Fabrizio Moretti (born 1980), Brazilian-born drummer in American band The Strokes
Filomena Moretti (born 1973), Italian classical guitarist
Francesco Saverio Moretti (1800–1866), Italian painter active in the Marche region
Franco Moretti (born 1950), Italian literary scholar
Frank Moretti (1943–2013), professor at Columbia University
Giampiero Moretti (1940–2012), Italian racing driver
Giangiacomo Moretti (born 1843), Croatian-born Italian painter, mainly of genre subjects
Giovanni Moretti (footballer) (1909–1971), Italian professional forward football player
Giuseppe Moretti (botanist) (1782–1853), Italian botanist
Giovanni Moretti (bishop) (1923–2018), Apostolic Pro-Nuncio of Thailand; Apostolic Delegate to Malaysia, Singapore, Laos 
Giovanni Moretti (composer) (1807–1884), Italian composer and conductor active in Naples
Giuseppe Moretti (1857–1935), Italian sculptor
Hector Moretti (born 1973), former professional tennis player from Argentina
Hans Moretti (1928–2013), Ukrainian illusionist and escapologist
Isabelle Moretti (born 1964), French harpist
Isabella Crettenand-Moretti, née Moretti (born 1963), Swiss ski mountaineer, long-distance and mountain runner
Joe Moretti (1938–2012), Scottish guitarist
Joseph Moretti (died 1793), Italianòborn-German architect 
Isabella Crettenand-Moretti (born 1963), Swiss ski mountaineer, marathon mountain biker, long-distance and mountain runner
Kennedy Moretti (born 1966), Brazilian pianist and music professor
Lisa Mary Moretti, (born 1961), American wrestler, known as "Ivory"
Luigi Moretti (politician) (1944), Italian politician
Luigi Moretti (archbishop) (born 1949), Italian Roman Catholic Archbishop of Salerno-Campagna-Acerno from 2010 to 2019
Luigi Moretti (1907–1973), Italian architect
Marino Moretti (1885–1979), Italian poet and author
Mario Moretti (born 1946), Italian terrorist
Mario Moretti (rower) (1906–1977), Italian rower
Mario Moretti Polegato (born 1952), Italian entrepreneur, founder of Geox company
Maurizio Moretti (1945–2021), Italian professional footballer
Mauro Moretti (born 1953), Italian executive and former CEO and General Manager of Leonardo S.p.A. 
Michel Moretti (born 1989), French footballer
Michèle Moretti (born 1940), French actress
Nanni Moretti (born 1953), Italian film director, producer and actor
Paolo Moretti (born 1970), Italian basketball player and coach; father of Davide Moretti
Pasqualino Moretti (born 1947), former Italian cyclist
Raoul Moretti (born 1933), a French composer of film scores
Riccardo Moretti (born 1985), Italian motorcycle racer
Riccardo Moretti (rower) (born 1967), Italian rower
Stefano Moretti, Italian musician, singer and teacher of music 
Tito Moretti (1840–1913), Italian painter and manuscript illuminator
Tobias Moretti (born 1959), Austrian actor
Willie Moretti (1894–1951), Italian-American mafia underboss

See also 

 Moretti (disambiguation)

Italian-language surnames